Gebre Waddell (born November 28, 1981) is an American entrepreneur, author, audio engineer, and software engineer from Memphis, Tennessee.

He is best known as Chief Executive Officer and Co-Founder of Sound Credit (Soundways) and as author of Complete Audio Mastering:  Practical Techniques published by McGraw-Hill,.  Waddell is a 2x GRAMMY nominee, with audio engineering work for musical artists including Ministry, Lil' Wayne, Rick Ross, Public Enemy and The Bar-Kays.

Early life
Waddell was born in Memphis, TN, his father was a self-taught civil-rights era sculptor, noted as being photographed during his career by photographer Ernest Withers. Waddell attended the University of Memphis, earning a degree in Business and Music.

Career

Entrepreneurship and Industry
In 2020, Waddell was elected to the national Board of Trustees of the Recording Academy/GRAMMYs which includes Yolanda Adams, John Legend, PJ Morton and others comprising the 40-seat board.  He was also appointed by Tennessee Governor Bill Lee to the Tennessee Entertainment Commission in late 2019.

Waddell appeared with supermodel Karlie Kloss in 2020 for the CSForAll Commitments Summit, for a discussion around the expansion of access to computer science education.

On March 17, 2019, Waddell appeared on 60 Minutes, in a feature on the Revolution Fund and its investment in Sound Credit.  It also covered the connections fostered by Revolution between industry leaders such as Eric Schmidt of Google and their consulting with entrepreneurs in the fund.

In 2018, Waddell was one of eight winners of the Revolution Fund's Rise of the Rest tour and funding for seed stage capital.  The Revolution Fund investors include Jeff Bezos, Jim Breyer and Eric Schmidt, and its funding of Sound Credit was matched by VC, Innova Capital.  Later that year, Inside Memphis Business magazine selected Waddell as 2018 Innovator of the Year.

In 2016, Waddell became Co-Founder and Chief Executive Officer of Sound Credit (Soundways), a music industry technology corporation based in Memphis, TN.

In 2013, Waddell developed Refinement, an audio processor for controlling the sensation of harshness in audio signals, and licensed it to Brainworx Germany, who then developed a commercial product called bx_refinement (based on the Refinement prototype). Brainworx sells bx_refinement via Plugin Alliance and Universal Audio. bx_Refinement was released in 2014 as the first audio plugin simultaneously released across the Plugin Alliance and UAD platforms.

Waddell released a multi-sampled software instrument named ReasonRhodes that mimicked the classic Fender Rhodes piano.  ReasonRhodes was featured on the cover of Keyboard magazine in 2006, together with a story that covered Waddell's work in developing the instrument.

Audio engineering
Waddell was elected President of the Recording Academy Memphis Chapter in 2017.  He was elected to the Recording Academy Memphis Chapter Board of Governors in 2016, and became a co-chair of the Producers & Engineers Wing.

In 2013, "Complete Audio Mastering: Practical Techniques", authored by Gebre Waddell was published by McGraw-Hill Professional.

Waddell created a printed frequency chart in 2010 that displays the frequency energy of common musical instruments with standardized spectrograms.  The spectrograms were created from recordings of each instrument playing each note of their range.  The print, titled The Frequency Domain is now found in studios and institutions including Stanford University, Harvard University, and in the office of audio icon, Rupert Neve.

He received his first breaks with a project produced by John Tesh in 2005, and Public Enemy in 2006 on their album, "How You Sell Soul to a Soulless People Who Sold Their Soul".

In 2003, Waddell established a mastering studio, Stonebridge Mastering, located in downtown Memphis, TN.

Boards and organizations
 National Board of Trustees, Recording Academy / GRAMMYS 
 Tennessee State Office, TN Entertainment Commission 
 Innovator of the Year, Inside Memphis Business (2018) 
 Chapter President, The Recording Academy / GRAMMY Memphis Chapter (2017–19)
 Board of Directors, Smithsonian Rock and Soul Museum (2018–19)
 Tennessee State Office, TN Interactive Digital Media Council (2017-)
 Board of Directors, Roots & American Music Society (2016-)

References

1981 births
Living people
University of Memphis alumni
American music industry executives
African-American company founders
American technology company founders
Businesspeople from Tennessee
Writers from Memphis, Tennessee
African-American non-fiction writers
American technology chief executives
21st-century African-American people
20th-century African-American people